Franz Geiger (1921–2011) was a German screenwriter of film and television.

Selected filmography
 Oh, You Dear Fridolin (dir. Peter Hamel, 1952)
 School for Marriage (1954) — based on The Art of Being Happily Married by André Maurois
 Lola Montès (dir. Max Ophüls, 1955) — based on a novel by Cécil Saint-Laurent
 My Ninety Nine Brides (dir. Alfred Vohrer, 1958) — based on a novel by 
 Agatha, Stop That Murdering! (dir. Dietrich Haugk, 1960)
 Bankraub in der Rue Latour (dir. Curd Jürgens, 1961)
 Father Brown (1966–1972, TV series)
  (dir. , 1968)
 Up the Establishment (dir. Michael Verhoeven, 1969)
 Der kleine Doktor (1974, TV series)
  (1974–1975, TV series)
 Polizeiinspektion 1 (1977–1983, TV series)
 Der Millionenbauer (dir. Georg Tressler, 1979, TV series)
 Der ganz normale Wahnsinn (dir. Helmut Dietl, 1979, TV series)
 Unsere schönsten Jahre (1983, TV series)
 Monaco Franze (dir. Helmut Dietl, 1983, TV series)
  (dir. Franz Geiger, 1986, TV series)
 Der elegante Hund (dir. Franz Geiger, 1987–1988, TV series)

References

Bibliography 
 Georges Sadoul. Dictionary of Films. University of California Press, 1972.

External links 
 

1921 births
2011 deaths
Mass media people from Munich